Sean O'Brien is an American labor leader who is the General President of the International Brotherhood of Teamsters.  He formerly served as the Vice President Eastern Region of the International Brotherhood of Teamsters (IBT). O'Brien was the youngest person elected as President of Teamsters Local Union 25 and was the Secretary-Treasurer of New England Joint Council 10. O'Brien resigned from Local 25 and Joint Council 10 on March 1, 2022, in order to serve full-time as General President of the International Brotherhood of Teamsters. O'Brien was sworn into office as the 11th General President of the International Brotherhood of Teamsters at the union's headquarters in Washington, D.C. on March 22, 2022.

Early life
O’Brien grew up in a Teamsters family, with his father, grandfather, and great-grandfather all members of Local 25 in Boston, driving trucks. He has two sons, his oldest, Sean Jr. is an up and coming stand up comedian, while his youngest Joseph, is an accomplished athlete. O’Brien attended University of Massachusetts Boston for one semester before joining Local 25 in 1991.

Teamster leadership
In 2006, O’Brien was elected president of Local 25, and has been re-elected six times as of 2022. In the fifteen-year span of his presidency, the local’s membership has increased by 30%, notably organizing a group of more than 1000 parking lot attendants, many of whom were immigrants from East Africa.

In 2013 O’Brien was suspended for two weeks for threatening members of the reform group Teamsters for a Democratic Union (TDU) who were opposing one of his allies. O’Brien apologized and the lead TDU advocate in the episode later supported him.

In 2017, O'Brien was the lead negotiator for the Teamsters with United Parcel Service (UPS) during bargaining for a new national contract, covering approximately 240,000 drivers, package sorters, loaders and clerks. He was dismissed from his position as Package Division director by James P. Hoffa after reaching out to Teamster Locals and members that had opposed Hoffa's reelection as general president.

Campaign For General President of IBT
In May 2018 O'Brien announced his candidacy to run against long-standing General President James P. Hoffa of the International Brotherhood of Teamsters. Hoffa eventually decided not to seek reelection and instead endorsed Steve Vairma, another vice president. The Sean O'Brien and Fred Zuckerman Slate was endorsed by Teamsters for a Democratic Union (a rank and file teamster reform organization) in November 2019 after a UPS contract was signed, despite a majority of members voting against the contract terms. O’Brien also campaigned on organizing Amazon workers. In November 2021, O’Brien was elected, defeating Vaima in a rare win for a candidate who was neither an incumbent nor endorsed by the incumbent Teamsters president. O’Brien assumed the role in March 2022.

Local 25 Charity Work
Under O'Brien's leadership Local 25 has raised more than $5,000,000 for charitable causes.

References 

International Brotherhood of Teamsters people
Living people
American trade union leaders
People from Massachusetts
Trade unionists from Massachusetts
1972 births